Mel Semenko (born December 12, 1937) was a Canadian football player who played for the BC Lions, Ottawa Rough Riders and Montreal Alouettes. He played college football at the University of Colorado.

References

1937 births
BC Lions players
Living people
Ottawa Rough Riders players
Montreal Alouettes players
Colorado Buffaloes football players